The Ingrate is a 1908 American silent short drama film directed by D. W. Griffith.

Cast
 Arthur V. Johnson as The Trapper
 Florence Lawrence as The Trapper's Wife
 George Gebhardt as The Canuck

References

External links
 

1908 films
1908 drama films
1908 short films
Silent American drama films
American silent short films
American black-and-white films
Films directed by D. W. Griffith
Films shot in Connecticut
1900s American films